Beech House may refer to:

 Beech House, Cheltenham, birthplace of British post-punk band Pigbag
 Beech House, designed by American architect Hugh Newell Jacobsen
 Beech House Stud, an English Thoroughbred racehorse breeding farm near Newmarket, Suffolk

See also
 The Olive Branch and Beech House, a hotel and restaurant in Rutland, England
 Thomas and Jane Beech House, in Coalville, Utah
 Beach House (disambiguation)